Chaplain (Major General) Gerhardt Wilfred Hyatt, USA (July 1, 1916 – August 30, 1985) was an American Army officer who served as the 13th Chief of Chaplains of the United States Army from 1971 to 1975. He was ordained in the  Lutheran Church–Missouri Synod. After his retirement from the army, he became president of Concordia College in St. Paul, Minnesota.

Awards and decorations

Gallery

References

Further reading

1916 births
1985 deaths
United States Army generals
Recipients of the Distinguished Service Medal (US Army)
Recipients of the Legion of Merit
Chiefs of Chaplains of the United States Army
Burials at Arlington National Cemetery
Deputy Chiefs of Chaplains of the United States Army
Lutheran Church–Missouri Synod people
20th-century American clergy